Defending champion Pete Sampras successfully defended his title, defeating Goran Ivanišević in the final, 7–6(7–2), 7–6(7–5), 6–0 to win the gentlemen's singles tennis title at the 1994 Wimbledon Championships.

Seeds

  Pete Sampras (champion)
  Michael Stich (first round)
  Stefan Edberg (second round)
  Goran Ivanišević (final)
  Jim Courier (second round)
  Todd Martin (semifinals)
  Boris Becker (semifinals)
  Sergi Bruguera (fourth round)
  Andriy Medvedev (fourth round)
  Michael Chang (quarterfinals)
  Petr Korda (second round)
  Andre Agassi (fourth round)
  Cédric Pioline (first round)
  Marc Rosset (second round)
  Yevgeny Kafelnikov (third round)
  Arnaud Boetsch (first round)

Qualifying

Draw

Finals

Top half

Section 1

Section 2

Section 3

Section 4

Bottom half

Section 5

Section 6

Section 7

Section 8

References

External links

 1994 Wimbledon Championships – Men's draws and results at the International Tennis Federation

Men's Singles
Wimbledon Championship by year – Men's singles